Ludwich "Loed" Jahn was a footballer who played for the Indonesia national football team.

Career statistics

International

International goals
Scores and results list the Dutch East Indies' goal tally first.

References

Indonesian footballers
Indonesia international footballers
Association football forwards
Year of birth missing